Akbarabad (also Romanized as Akbarābād; also known as Deh Bāqel and Deh Bāqer) is a village in Ekhtiarabad Rural District, in the Central District of Kerman County, Kerman Province, Iran. At the 2006 census, its population was 51, in 13 families.

References 

Populated places in Kerman County